The Fly Castelluccio SMN is an Italian paramotor that was designed and produced by Fly Castelluccio of Ascoli Piceno for powered paragliding. Now out of production, when it was available the aircraft were supplied complete and ready-to-fly.

Design and development
The SMN was designed to comply with the US FAR 103 Ultralight Vehicles rules as well as European regulations. It features a paraglider-style wing, single-place accommodation and a single Simonini Racing engine in pusher configuration powering a two-bladed  wooden propeller through a reduction drive.

As is the case with all paramotors, take-off and landing is accomplished by foot. Inflight steering is accomplished via handles that actuate the canopy brakes, creating roll and yaw.

Specifications (SMN)

References

SMN
2000s Italian ultralight aircraft
Single-engined pusher aircraft
Paramotors